Salera Hill is a pilgrimage centre (ziyarat) in Damascus, Syria. The following sacred spots are located on it:

 Cave of Ashab al-Kahf
 Koh-e Raqim
 Masjid Sulayman
 Footprint of Imam Ali
 Sermon (khutba) written by Imam Ali on stone with his finger.

Ziyarat
Geography of Damascus
Mausoleums in Syria